Blind Fool Love were an Italian post-hardcore band, founded in Grosseto, Tuscany in 2005. In 2007 the band released their first demo, followed by the EP Il pianto in May 2011. The first studio album is called La strage di Cupido and was released on September 27, 2011, by Sanic Studios. The band split in 2012.

Members 
Tommaso Sabatini – guitars, lead vocals
Piero Cini – bass
Marco Ronconi – drums

Discography 
 Albums
Incubi di maggio (demo, 2007)
Ninna nanna (demo, 2007)
Il pianto (EP, 2011)
La strage di Cupido (studio album, 2011)

 Music videos
Vampiro (2009)
Saranno giorni (2010)
Il pianto (2011)
La ballata della farfalla melitaea (2011)
Com'eri un tempo (2011)

References

External links
 Official website

Italian rock music groups